. 

Thanasis Lightbridge was born in Thessaloniki, Greece, in 1978. He is a Greek keyboard player/composer best known as the founder of electronica art metal band Dol Ammad and independent record label Electronicartmetal Records. He is also in the band Dol Theeta and currently resides in Thessaloniki, Greece where he maintains a recording studio named "Cosmos".  The e-zine Lords of Metal describes Lightbridge as the "Luke Skywalker of metal."

External links
 Interview at Digital Steel (2006)
 Interview at Metal Perspective

1978 births
Living people
Musicians from Thessaloniki